The Kajaki Dam Incident occurred on the 6 September 2006, when 4 Soviet anti-personnel mines, left over from the Soviet occupation of Afghanistan, were detonated by soldiers of the 3rd Battalion, Parachute Regiment, British Army. One soldier was fatally wounded, and seven others sustained serious injuries during the blasts.

Background

The troops were based at "Normandy" outpost in Helmand. They were there to protect the Afghan village of Kajaki from the Taliban militant group.

Incident

In the early hours of the 6th September 2006, Taliban activity was spotted in the form of a checkpoint being set up by armed militants. Corporal Stu Pearson, who was commander of the Normandy outpost, was alerted by Lance Corporal Stewart Hale to the activity, and was informed that Hale could potentially engage the militants with his sniper rifle. However, they had spotted a more suitable vantage point across the dam. As they traversed the landscape towards their vantage point, LCpl Hale stood on and triggered a land mine, suffering an amputation of his lower right leg and serious injuries to his right hand, including the loss of a finger; he initially thought he had been hit by a mortar shell. The remaining paratroopers in the dam began to administer first aid and a tourniquet while calling for support from any surrounding units and a winch from a UH-60 Black Hawk helicopter. This was important, as a Black Hawk has a winch to winch injured up and the downforce of the blades is low, avoiding any danger of triggering more mines in the minefield. As more troopers arrived, Hale was moved onto a small embankment on the side of the riverbed. This is when Pearson went to retrieve a water bottle left at the scene where Hale was being treated, and triggered another explosion. Corporal Mark Wright had requested a Black Hawk helicopter, equipped with a winch to winch the men out of the dam and avoid having to land a helicopter in the minefield, potentially triggering more mines. However, a Black Hawk was not available at the time, so a Chinook helicopter was dispatched. The downdraught of the Chinook's blades caused a third mine to be detonated causing further injuries.

Aftermath
Five of the British paratroopers involved in the incident sued the British Ministry of Defence for "breaching their duty of care". It was settled without trial with "seven-number figure" for Stuart Pearson, who used £600,000 pounds of those for  his state-of-the-art prosthetics. Compensation was also won for Mark Wright’s family and Andrew Barlow.

In popular culture
The 2014 British film Kajaki (film) is based on the Kajaki dam incident.

References 

Helmand Province
War in Afghanistan (2001–2021) casualties